National English School is a co-educational institution (Nursery - Class XII) located in Baguiati, Kolkata, India. It is affiliated with the Council for the Indian School Certificate Examinations. It was established in 2000 by philanthropist Sudhir Kumar Saha. In 2008, a campus at Rajarhat was established. In 2017, a B.Ed college  called National College of Education was also established for training teachers with degrees in Bachelor of Education. (B.Ed)

Campuses
 VIP Road Campus (main campus)
 Deshbandhunagar Branch (est. 2008)
 Rajarhat Campus (est. 2008)
 National College of Education – Rajarhat (est. 2017)

References

External links
 

High schools and secondary schools in Kolkata
Educational institutions established in 2000
2000 establishments in West Bengal